Tooncan was an animation studio based in Montreal, Quebec founded by Paul Cadieux. The company has worked on TF1's The Bellflower Bunnies and Sylvain Chomet's The Triplets of Belleville.

List of programmes
Rotten Ralph (1996) (co-production with The Disney Channel)
Not So Rotten Ralph (1996) (co-production with The Disney Channel)
Rotten Ralph (1999) (co-production with Italtoons Corporation, Cosgrove Hall Films and BBC TV)
Charley and Mimmo (2000) (co-production with Vip Toons, Cymax, Canal J, Nathan Entertainment and Les Armateurs)
X-DuckX (2001) (co-production with Alphanim, France 3 and Europool)
Belphegor (2001) (co-production with KG Prince, France 2, France 3 and Les Armateurs)
Iron Nose (2001) (co-production with Futurikon, Megafun Productions, Melusine Productions SA and Metrapole Production (M6))
Snailympics (2001) (co-production with Truca Films)
The New Adventures of Lucky Luke (2001) (co-production with Xilam Animation and Tube Studios)
Spaced Out (2001) (co-production with Canal+, Cartoon Network Europe and Alphanim)
Wombat City (2001) (co-production with Les Films de la Perrine, France 2, Beachmark Productions LLC and Carrere Group)
Kaput and Zösky: The Ultimate Obliterators (2002) (co-production with Futurikon)
Malo Korrigan (2002) (co-production with Futurikon, M6 and Canal J)
Martin Morning (2002) (co-production with Espaces Verts and ZDF Enterprises)
Ratz (2003) (co-production with France 3 and Xilam Animation)
Mica (2003) (co-production with Ricochets Productions S.A.R.L.)
The Triplets of Belleville (2003) (co-production with France 3, BBC TV, Production Champion, Vivi Film and Les Armateurs)
Woofy (2003) (co-production with Alphanim)
Kitou (2003) (co-production with Dargaud Marina, TF1, Belvision and RTBF)
Milo (2003) (co-production with Gertie, Rai Fiction, Les Films de la Perrine, Carrere Group and France 5)
Cosmic Cowboys (2003) (co-production with Alphanim)
3 Gold Coins (2004)
The Bellflower Bunnies (2004) (co-production with Big Cash, Euro Visual and TF1)
Prudence Gumshoe (2004) (co-production with Films de la Perrine)
Dragon Hunters (2004) (co-production with Futurikon)
The Boy (2004)
Billy and Buddy (2004) (co-production with Bel Ombre Films, Dargaud Marina and Télétoon)
The Adventures of Princess Sydney (2004) (co-production with Planlarge Enterprises Ltd and Greenfield Toons)
Tupu (2004) (co-production with Xilam Animation)
Yakari (2005) (co-production with Storimages, 2Minutes, Belvision and RTBF)
Shaolin's Kids (2005) (co-production with Les Villains Garçons)
Lili's Island (2005) (co-production with Teleimages Kids and Je Suis Bien Content)
A Cat, A Cow and the Ocean (2006) (co-production with Futurikon, 2 Minutes, France 5 and Disney Television France)
Zoé Kezako (2006) (co-production with TeamTO, TF1, TPS Jeunesse and Télétoon)
Oscar and Spike (2008) (co-production with Les Vilains Garçons)
Nelly and Caesar (2008) (co-production with Studio St-Antoine)
Okura (2008) (co-production with Les Films de la Perrine, France 2 and Carrere Group)
Eo (2009)
Tempo Express (2010) (co-production with ZDF, Les Cartooneurs Associes and Fantasia Animation)
Fishtronaut (2010) (co-production with TV PinGuim (Brazil), Discovery Kids Latin America and Yoopa)
Anatane: Saving the Children of Okura (2018) (co-production with Les Films de la Perrine and France Télévisions)

References

Canadian animation studios
Companies based in Montreal
Entertainment companies established in 1994